Eling  may refer to the following places:

Eling, Berkshire, England
Eling, Hampshire, England
Eling Park, Chongqing

See also
Ealing (disambiguation)